The 1966–67 Bulgarian Cup was the 27th season of the Bulgarian Cup (in this period the tournament was named Cup of the Soviet Army). Levski Sofia won the competition, beating Spartak Sofia 3–0 in the final at the Vasil Levski National Stadium.

First round

|}

Group stage

Group 1
Matches were played in Dobrich and Varna

|}

Group 2
Matches were played in Pazardzhik and Plovdiv

|}

Group 3
Matches were played in Burgas and Sliven

|}

Group 4
Matches were played in Sofia and Blagoevgrad

|}

Semi-finals

Final

Details

References

1966-67
1966–67 domestic association football cups
Cup